Boisclair is a surname. Notable people with the surname include:

André Boisclair (born 1966), Canadian politician
Bruce Boisclair (born 1952), American baseball player
James Boisclair, African-American gold miner
Maxime Boisclair (born 1985), Haitian Canadian ice hockey player